Thomas Henry Guinzburg (March 30, 1926 – September 8, 2010) was an American editor and publisher who served as the first managing editor of The Paris Review following its inception in 1953 and later succeeded his father as president of the Viking Press.

Life and career
Guinzburg was born on March 30, 1926, to a Jewish family in Manhattan. His father, Harold K. Guinzburg, the publisher and co-founder of Viking Press, gave him a manuscript copy of The Story of Ferdinand when he was nine years old. Guinzburg enjoyed the book so much that it convinced his father to publish the book and ended up selling four million copies, giving the young Guinzburg his first inkling that he might have a career in the publishing business. He attended the Hotchkiss School and served in the United States Marine Corps, where he received the Purple Heart for action on Iwo Jima. After completing his military service he attended Yale University, where he was a member of Skull and Bones as well as the managing editor of the Yale Daily News at the same time that William F. Buckley, Jr. was editor.

Guinzburg visited Paris in the 1950s after graduating from Yale, joining other literati such as Donald Hall, Peter Matthiessen, George Plimpton and William Styron. He joined with Matthiessen and Plimpton in 1953 to establish The Paris Review, an English-language literary magazine for "the good writers and good poets, the non-drumbeaters and non-axe grinders. So long as they're good" that is known for its author interviews about their writing craft and for helping launch the careers of such authors as T. Coraghessan Boyle, Jack Kerouac, V. S. Naipaul, Adrienne Rich, Philip Roth and Mona Simpson. Guinzburg was chosen as the Paris Review'''s first managing editor, as he was the only one with and prior publishing experience, building on his time at the Yale Daily News. Editor Robert B. Silvers of The New York Review of Books cited Guinzburg's "marvelous combination of idealist and realist" in which "He was always encouraging The Review not to be deterred from discovering young writers of quality" while always maintaining "a grasp of the really rough details of commercial publishing."

He joined the publicity department at Viking Press in 1954 and assumed the position of president after his father's death in 1961.Staff. "Harold K. Gulnzburg, 61, Dead; Co-Founder of the Viking Press; President of Publishing Firm Started Literary Guild and Portable Library Editions", The New York Times October 19, 1961. Accessed September 13, 2010. Viking was purchased by Penguin Books in 1975 for a price estimated at $12 million. Guinzburg retained his title as president at the combined firm Viking/Penguin. Jacqueline Kennedy Onassis, whom he hired as an editor in 1975, joined other notable editors he brought to Viking, including Aaron Asher, Elisabeth Sifton and Corlies Smith. Onassis left the firm in 1977 after Viking published the Jeffrey Archer book Shall We Tell the President?, a fictional political thriller that depicted an assassination plot against U.S. President Ted Kennedy. Among the many literary prizes awarded to Viking authors during his tenure as president were eight National Book Awards, three Pulitzer Prizes, and two Nobel Prizes in literature. Guinzburg published books by Saul Bellow, Kingsley Amis, Rebecca West, Nadine Gordimer, Graham Greene, Wallace Stegner, John Ashberry, Arthur Miller, Hannah Arendt, Malcolm Cowley, Jimmy Breslin, Gordon Parks, Jack Kerouac, Ken Kesey, James Baldwin,Iris Murdoch and John Steinbeck who was the Best Man at his wedding to Rusty Unger. He published Gravity's Rainbow'', the 1973 book by Thomas Pynchon, which won the National Book Award the following year. As a now infamous stunt, Guinzburg had Professor Irwin Corey accept the award on Pynchon's behalf, delivering a hilarious stream-of-consciousness speech in which he referred to the author as "Richard Python".

In 1980 he was a founding member of the original Rotisserie Baseball League.

Guinzburg was an active philanthropist, sponsoring and working intensively with an inner city high school class as part of Eugene Lang's I Have a Dream Foundation and founding The Dream Team of Memorial Sloan–Kettering Cancer Center. which fulfills wishes of adult cancer patients.

Guinzburg died in Manhattan at age 84 on September 8, 2010, due to complications of heart bypass surgery. He was survived by a companion of 15 years, Victoria Anstead, two granddaughters, a daughter Kate and a son Michael from his first wife, actress Rita Gam, whom he married in 1956. He was also survived by a daughter, Amanda Guinzburg, from his second marriage to writer, Rusty Unger.

References

1926 births
2010 deaths
United States Marine Corps personnel of World War II
20th-century American Jews
American publishers (people)
Hotchkiss School alumni
United States Marines
Yale University alumni
The Paris Review
21st-century American Jews
Deaths from complications of heart surgery